Chaetodiadema africanum is a species of sea urchins of the Family Diadematidae. Their armour is covered with spines. Chaetodiadema africanum was first scientifically described in 1924 by Hubert Lyman Clark.

See also 

 Ceratophysa ceratopyga
 Ceratophysa rosea
 Chaetodiadema granulatum

References 

Animals described in 1924
Diadematidae